The 1987 Fidelity Unit Trusts International Open was a professional ranking snooker tournament that took place between September and October 1987 at Trentham Gardens in Stoke-on-Trent, England. The last 64 round took place between 9th and 12 September 1987 and television coverage on ITV from the last 32 to the final from 25th September to 4th October.

Steve Davis retained the title by defeating Cliff Thorburn 12–5 in the final.


Main draw

References

Scottish Open (snooker)
International Open
International Open
International Open
International Open
Sport in Stoke-on-Trent